"Play with Fire" is a song by the English rock band the Rolling Stones, originally released as B-side to the song "The Last Time". It was later included on the American release of their 1965 album Out of Our Heads.

Composition and recording
"Play with Fire" is credited to Nanker Phelge, a pseudonym used when tracks were composed by the entire band, even though lead singer Mick Jagger and guitarist Keith Richards are the only Rolling Stones to appear on the track. The song was recorded late one night in January 1965 while the Stones were in Los Angeles recording with Phil Spector at the RCA Studios. Richards performed the song's acoustic guitar opening while Jagger handled vocals and tambourine (enhanced using an echo chamber). Spector played bass,  and Jack Nitzsche provided the song's distinctive harpsichord arrangement and tamtams. The Stones left for a tour of Australia the following day.

The song's lyrics talk of the singer's relationship with a high society girl, disparaging the lifestyle much in the same way that "19th Nervous Breakdown" would in a more up-tempo feel. The title derives from the saying "If you play with fire, you will get burned."

In a 1995 interview with Jann Wenner for Rolling Stone, entitled "Jagger Remembers," Jagger said, "'Play with Fire' sounds amazing—when I heard it last. I mean, it's a very in-your-face kind of sound and very clearly done. You can hear all the vocal stuff on it. And I'm playing the tambourines, the vocal line. You know, it's very pretty." According to Richie Unterberger, a friend of the Stones wrote that an unreleased version of the song, entitled "Mess with Fire", was also recorded, featuring a much more upbeat, soul-oriented feel. However, the story is considered dubious by Unterberger.  In a contemporary review, Cash Box described it as "a tender, lyrical hauntingly plaintive weeper."

Releases and lawsuit
"Play with Fire" went to No. 96 on the U.S. chart. It was also featured on the U.S. version of Big Hits (High Tide and Green Grass) (1966), Hot Rocks (1971) and Singles Collection: The London Years (1989).  The song was performed in concert during the Rolling Stones' tours of 1965 and 1966, and was revived on their 1989–90 Steel Wheels/Urban Jungle Tour.

In July 2008, "Play with Fire" became the subject of a lawsuit when ABKCO Music, which owns the rights to the Rolling Stones' early catalogue, filed a suit against Lil Wayne, asserting that the rapper's song "Playing with Fire" is based on the Rolling Stones' song.

Personnel
 Mick Jagger – lead and harmony vocals, tambourine
 Keith Richards – acoustic guitar
 Jack Nitzsche – harpsichord, tam-tam
 Phil Spector – bass guitar

References

The Rolling Stones songs
1965 songs
1965 singles
Songs written by Jagger–Richards
Song recordings produced by Andrew Loog Oldham
Decca Records singles
London Records singles